The 2018 Tour de Yorkshire was a four day cycling stage race held in Yorkshire over 3–6 May 2018. It was the fourth edition of the Tour de Yorkshire, organised by Welcome to Yorkshire and the Amaury Sport Organisation. The 2018 TDY differed from its predecessor in that the event was extended to four days from three, with the women's event being extended to two days over the 3 and 4 May 2018.

Route
The Tour was extended in September 2017 to allow for greater creativity in the route planning. Additionally, the British Cycling chief executive Julie Harrington said: "[This] will give even more people a chance to see our great sport at close quarters."

In December 2017, the start and finish locations were announced as Beverley and Doncaster, Barnsley and Ilkley, Richmond and Scarborough, and Halifax and Leeds.

Teams
Twenty teams were announced as partaking in the event. These were:

Aqua Blue Sport (Ireland)
Astana Pro Team (Kazakhstan)
BMC Racing Team (United States)
Canyon Eisberg (Great Britain)
Cofidis, Solutions Credits (France)
Team Dimension Data (South Africa)
Direct Énergie (France)
Euskadi Basque Country–Murias (Spain)
Great Britain Cycling Team (Great Britain)
Holdsworth Pro Racing (Great Britain)
JLT-Condor (Great Britain)
Madison Genesis (Great Britain)
ONE Pro Cycling (Great Britain)
Rally Cycling (United States)
Roompot – Nederlandse Loterij (Netherlands)
Team Katusha–Alpecin (Switzerland)
Team Sky (Great Britain)
Team Sunweb (Germany)
Vital Concept (France)
Vitus Pro Cycling (Great Britain)

Stages

Stage 1
3 May 2018 — Beverley to Doncaster,

Stage 2
4 May 2018 — Barnsley to Ilkley,

Stage 3
5 May 2018 — Richmond to Scarborough,

Stage 4
6 May 2018 — Halifax to Leeds,

Classification leadership table
In the Tour de Yorkshire, four different jerseys were awarded. The general classification was calculated by adding each cyclist's finishing times on each stage. Time bonuses were awarded to the first three finishers on all stages: the stage winner won a ten-second bonus, with six and four seconds for the second and third riders respectively. Bonus seconds were also awarded to the first three riders at intermediate sprints; three seconds for the winner of the sprint, two seconds for the rider in second and one second for the rider in third. The leader of the general classification received a light blue and yellow jersey. This classification was considered the most important of the Tour de Yorkshire, and the winner of the classification was considered the winner of the race.

The second classification was the points classification. Riders were awarded points for finishing in the top ten in a stage. Unlike in the points classification in the Tour de France, the winners of all stages were awarded the same number of points. Points were also won in intermediate sprints; five points for crossing the sprint line first, three points for second place and one for third. The leader of the points classification was awarded a green jersey.

There was also a mountains classification, for which points were awarded for reaching the top of a climb before other riders. Each climb was categorised the same, with four points awarded to the first rider over the top of each climb. Two points were awarded for the second-placed rider, with one point for third place. The leadership of the mountains classification was marked by a pink jersey.

Another jersey was awarded at the end of each stage. This was a combativity prize and was awarded to the rider who "made the greatest effort and [...] demonstrated the best qualities in terms of sportsmanship". A jury selected a list of riders to be eligible for the prize; the winner of the prize was then decided by a vote on Twitter. The rider was awarded a grey jersey. There was also a classification for teams, in which the times of the best three cyclists in a team on each stage were added together; the leading team at the end of the race was the team with the lowest cumulative time.

References

External links

Official website

2018 in English sport
2018 UCI Europe Tour
2018